Isidoro de Redondillo was a Spanish painter of the 17th century and the Baroque period. He was a pupil of Angelo Nardi. He practiced at Madrid, and was appointed painter to Carlos II, King of Spain in 1685. He painted portraits and historical pictures.

See also 
Isidoro Arredondo

References

Spanish Baroque painters
17th-century Spanish painters
Spanish male painters